The men's 3 metre springboard was part of the Diving at the 2018 Commonwealth Games program. The competition was held on 12 April 2018 at Gold Coast Aquatic Centre in Gold Coast.

Format
The competition was held in two rounds:
 Preliminary round: All 17 divers perform six dives; the top 12 divers advance to the final.
 Final: The 12 divers perform six dives; the preliminary round scores are erased and the top three divers win the gold, silver and bronze medals accordingly.

Schedule
All times are Australian Eastern Standard Time (UTC+10).

Results
Results:

Green denotes finalists

References

Diving at the 2018 Commonwealth Games